Ideon Science Park is a science park in Lund, Sweden that is run and sponsored by Wihlborgs Fastigheter AB, Lund University and Lund Municipality.

St Ericsson, Sony, Ericsson, Axis Communications, Active Biotech  and Gambro all have their development centres right beside the park, and Mblox have one of their two Swedish offices here, with the other in Stockholm.

The development of Ideon came as a result of the 1970s restructuring in the Skåne business community. Ideon was founded by a collaboration between Lund University, the then Malmöhus county, Lund municipality and the business community.

See also
 Venture Cup

References

External links
 

Buildings and structures in Lund
Science parks in Sweden
20th-century establishments in Skåne County
Office buildings in Sweden
Pharmaceutical industry in Sweden
Information technology in Sweden